Zanawa-Pougouli is a town in the Bondigui Department of Bougouriba Province in south-western Burkina Faso. The town has a population of 1,172.

References

Populated places in the Sud-Ouest Region (Burkina Faso)